Death Is Not Dead is the ninth studio album by Swedish melodic death metal band The Crown which was released by Century Media Records on 13 January 2015. In this album, Johan Lindstrand returned for the first time since his departure after Possessed 13 came out in 2003. The album is the last one in which Janne Saarenpää will play his drums for the band. The album was released to coincide with the 25th anniversary of the band.

Track listing

Bonus CD
The "Bonus CD" of the album came with two extra tracks, namely: "We Come In Peace (Piece By Piece)" 4:42 long and "Agent Orange" which was 6:01 in length.

Personnel
The Crown
Magnus Olsfelt – bass
Johan Lindstrand – vocals
Marcus Sunesson – guitars
Marko Tervonen – guitars
Janne Saarenpää – drums

Production
M. Engstrom – mixing
Kenneth Johansson – photography
Thomas Ewerhard – cover art, layout
Kenneth Svensson – mastering
Marcus Sunesson – recording
Marko Tervonen – recording
Chris Silver – producer, recording, mixing
Mark Brand – artwork

References

The Crown (band) albums
2015 albums
Century Media Records albums